Seiro may refer to:

 Seirō, Niigata, a town in Niigata prefecture, Japan
 Seiro (steamer), a steaming basket used in Japanese cuisine
 Seirogan, a traditional Japanese medicine
 Seirō Takeshi (born 1988), sumo wrestler

See also